Rolly Fula Nganga (born 2 February 1993) is a Congolese basketball player, who plays for APR and the Democratic Republic of the Congo national team.

Career
Fula Nganga started his career playing for ASB Soyo de Matadi, SCTP and Ravens, before signing with Mazembe in 2014. He stayed there for four years, winning the Cup of Congo three times (2014, 2017 and 2018). After that, Fula played with Dalia Sportive de Grombalia in Tunisia for one season. In 2019, he returned to Mazembe to play in the 2020 BAL Qualifying Tournaments.

In March 2020, Fula signed with GS Pétroliers in Algeria to play in the 2020 BAL season. However, due to the COVID-19 pandemic the season was cancelled and Fula never played for the team.

In October 2021, Fula was on the roster of Espoir Fukash during the 2022 BAL Qualifying Tournaments. He scored 29 points in the decisive game against AS Police, to help the team qualify for the 2022 BAL season. On April 19, 2022, Fula scored a game-high 29 points in Espoir's first-ever league win over Cape Town. In the 2022 BAL regular season, he averaged a team-high 18.4 points per game on 40.2% shooting from the field, along with 5.6 rebounds. 

In November 2022, he was on the roster of Bangui Sporting Club during the 2023 Road to BAL. 

In January 2023, Fula Nganga signed with APR of the Rwanda Basketball League (RBL).

National team career
Fula Nganga was a member of the DR Congo national basketball team, and helped the team win the gold medal at FIBA AfroCan 2019, contributing 17 points and 4.5 rebounds per game.

BAL career statistics

|-
|style="text-align:left;"|2022
|style="text-align:left;"|Espoir Fukash
| 5 || 4 || 32.5 || .402 || .317 || .750 || 5.6 || 2.4 || 1.0 || .4 || 18.4
|- class="sortbottom"
| style="text-align:center;" colspan="2"|Career
| 5 || 4 || 32.5 || .402 || .317 || .750 || 5.6 || 2.4 || 1.0 || .4 || 18.4

References

External links

1993 births
Living people
Democratic Republic of the Congo men's basketball players
Shooting guards
ASB Mazembe players
BC Espoir Fukash players
People from Lubumbashi
Dalia Sportive de Grombalia players
Democratic Republic of the Congo expatriate basketball people in Tunisia
Bangui Sporting Club players
APR B.C. players